The 2021 Nigerian state legislative elections were called to fill vacant seats in state Houses of Assembly.

Background 
The 991 members of the 36 state Houses of Assembly are elected from single-seat constituencies using first-past-the-post voting; when vacancies occur, by-elections (or bye-elections) are called, scheduled, and administered by the Independent National Electoral Commission.

Elections

Delta State

Isoko North State Constituency by-election 

On April 6, 2021, the member for Isoko North, Tim Owhefere (PDP) died from an undisclosed illness. In March, INEC set the date for the by-election for April 10 with party primaries taking place between March 11 and March 20. Jude Ogbimi, the PDP nominee, defeated runner-up Emmanuel Tabuko (APC) by over 83% and nearly 27,000 votes. The election had 25.51% turnout and was conducted peacefully according to participating candidates.

Isoko South I State Constituency by-election 

On June 27, 2021, the member for Isoko South I, Kenneth Ogba (PDP) died from an unspecified heart-related disease. In August, INEC set the date for the by-election for September 11 with party primaries taking place between August 4 and August 31. Ovuakpoye Evivie, the PDP nominee, defeated runners-up Ogaga Ifowodo (APC) and Michael Emumena Paul (SDP) by nearly 60% and over 5,500 votes. The election had 16.94% turnout and was successfully used as a test run for INEC's new Bimodal Voter Accreditation System (BVAS) device with candidates and observers praising INEC's conduct. However, the election's successful conduct was overshadowed by the murder of a local vigilante by gunmen at Polling Unit 5 of Irri Ward 10 and the nonfatal shooting of another person in Oleh. After the election, INEC disclosed that five BVAS devices had been stolen during the election and implored Evivie to help find and return them.

Ekiti State

Ekiti East I State Constituency by-election (postponed) 
On January 31, 2021, member for Ekiti East I Juwa Adegbuyi (APC) died from an undisclosed illness. In February, INEC set the date for the by-election for March 20 with party primaries taking place between February 26 and March 3. However, on the by-election date, multiple reports of violence and ballot snatching including the murder of 3 people at a polling station in Omuo where Senator Abiodun Olujimi was observing voting led INEC to suspend the by-election indefinitely.

Jigawa State

Kafin Hausa State Constituency by-election 

On January 18, 2021, member for Kafin Hausa, Adamu Babban Bare (APC), died from an undisclosed illness suspected to be cancer. Later in January, INEC set the date for the by-election for March 6 with party primaries taking place between February 2 and February 8. APC nominee and son of Adamu Babban Bare, Muhammad Adamu, defeated the PDP's Garba Tambale by 26% and over 6,300 votes. The election had 39.86% turnout and was conducted smoothly according to lawmakers and INEC officials.

Kaduna State

Sabon Gari State Constituency by-election 

On April 29, 2021, the seat of Sabon Gari was declared vacant after member Aminu Abdullahi Shagali (APC) did not attend legislative meetings for a prolonged period of time and did not submit a requested letter of apology to the House of Assembly. In May, INEC set the date for the by-election for June 19 with party primaries taking place between May 18 and May 24. The PDP nominee, Usman Baba, flipped the seat by defeating the APC's Musa Musa by 10% and over 1700 votes. The election was conducted peacefully according to journalists but was marred by low turnout, at 13.43%.

See also 
 2021 Nigerian House of Representatives elections

References 

state by-elections
2021 state